The Cincinnati Reds' 1988 season marked the last of four consecutive winning seasons for the Reds, all of which resulted in second place finishes in the National League West. Led by manager Pete Rose, the Reds finished with the best record of these four seasons at 87 wins and 74 losses, but finished seven games back of the eventual World Series champion Los Angeles Dodgers. The 1988 season would be Pete Rose's last full season as Reds manager.

Offseason
 November 6, 1987: Danny Jackson was acquired from the Kansas City Royals along with Angel Salazar for Ted Power and Kurt Stillwell.
 December 8, 1987: Dave Parker was traded by the Reds to the Oakland Athletics for José Rijo and Tim Birtsas.

Regular season
Danny Jackson became the last pitcher to win at least 20 games in one season for the Reds in the 20th Century. The 1988 season also marked the final season for the gifted shortstop, Dave Concepción, an integral member of the Big Red Machine of the 1970s in which he played the last of 19 years with the club.

Suspension of Pete Rose
The stage was set in a dramatic end of a home game on April 30 against the New York Mets, in which the score was tied 5–5 leading into the ninth inning. The game had been contentious throughout, with two hit batsman and a bench-clearing brawl in the seventh inning that resulted in the ejections of both Tom Browning and Darryl Strawberry. With the Mets batting with two outs in the top of the ninth, Mookie Wilson hit a ground ball to shortstop Barry Larkin, whose throw to first base was wide and pulled first baseman Nick Esasky's foot from the bag. First-base umpire Dave Pallone, who'd long been seen as unfair by the Reds, hesitated before making a delayed safe call. Esasky, waiting for the call, failed to make a throw to the plate on Howard Johnson's attempt to score from second base. Johnson's bold baserunning proved to be the difference and stood as the game-winning run for the Mets. A furious Pete Rose rushed from the dugout, vehemently arguing the call. Rose later claimed that Pallone hit him in the cheek with his finger, prompting Rose to shove Pallone twice with his shoulder and forearm knocking him backward. Rose was then ejected and had to be restrained by his own coaches. At the same time, fans in the stadium began showering the field with debris, at which time Pallone left the field with the players retreating to the dugouts.

After a nearly 15-minute suspension of play, the game was resumed with the remaining three umpires. National League president A. Bartlett Giamatti suspended Rose for thirty days, which was the longest suspension ever levied for an on-field incident involving a manager. Rose was also fined. In addition, Reds radio announcers Marty Brennaman and Joe Nuxhall were criticized for inciting the fan response with what were characterized by "inflammatory and completely irresponsible remarks". At the time, especially given Brennaman's and Nuxhall's iconic status in Cincinnati, it was common for spectators at ballparks to listen to their teams' radio broadcasts using portable radios.

Season standings

Record vs. opponents

Notable transactions
 March 29, 1988: Guy Hoffman was released by the Reds.
 May 14, 1988: Skeeter Barnes was signed as a free agent by the Reds.
 June 1, 1988: Paul Byrd was drafted by the Reds in the 13th round of the 1988 Major League Baseball Draft, but did not sign.
 June 20, 1988: Mario Soto was released by the Reds.
 July 11, 1988: Max Venable was signed as a free agent by the Reds.
 July 13, 1988: Tracy Jones and Pat Pacillo were traded by the Reds to the Montreal Expos for Jeff Reed, Herm Winningham, and Randy St. Claire.
 August 2, 1988: Ken Griffey, Sr. was signed as a free agent by the Reds.

Roster

All-Star Game

The 1988 Major League Baseball All-Star Game was the 59th playing of the midsummer classic between the all-stars of the American League (AL) and National League (NL), the two leagues comprising Major League Baseball. The game was held on July 12, 1988, at Riverfront Stadium in Cincinnati, the home of the Cincinnati Reds of the National League. The game resulted in the American League defeating the National League 2-1.

The Perfect Game

Tom Browning pitched a perfect game on September 16, 1988 against the Los Angeles Dodgers.

Scorecard
September 16, 1988, Riverfront Stadium, Cincinnati, Ohio

Batting

Pitching

Player stats

Batting

Starters by position
Note: Pos = Position; G = Games played; AB = At bats; H = Hits; Avg. = Batting average; HR = Home runs; RBI = Runs batted in

Other batters
Note: G = Games played; AB = At bats; H = Hits; Avg. = Batting average; HR = Home runs; RBI = Runs batted in

Pitching

Starting pitchers
Note: G = Games pitched; IP = Innings pitched; W = Wins; L = Losses; ERA = Earned run average; SO = Strikeouts

Other pitchers
Note: G = Games pitched; IP = Innings pitched; W = Wins; L = Losses; ERA = Earned run average; SO = Strikeouts

Relief pitchers
Note: G = Games pitched; W = Wins; L = Losses; SV = Saves; ERA = Earned run average; SO = Strikeouts

Farm system 

LEAGUE CHAMPIONS: Chattanooga, Cedar Rapids

Awards and honors
Ron Oester, Hutch Award

References

1988 Cincinnati Reds season at Baseball Reference
1988 Cincinnati Reds season at Baseball Almanac

Cincinnati Reds Season, 1988
Cincinnati Reds seasons
Cinc